Open Hostility is the seventh studio album by Canadian speed/thrash metal band Razor, released in 1991 by Fringe Product. Drummer Rob Mills was unable to participate on the album due to injuries sustained in an accident, so his parts were performed by guitarist Dave Carlo using a drum machine. Mills later returned for the filming of the "Sucker for Punishment" music video. Open Hostility is dedicated to the memory of Ray “Black Metal” Wallace.

Track listing

Notes
 Re-released in 1991 by Fringe Product as an advanced promo cassette
 Three vinyl pressings were released in 2010 by High Roller Records as a limited edition with two to three different colours. First pressing issued in a 425gsm heavy cardboard cover with lyric sheet, limited to 500 copies in black, clear with red splatter and red/yellow split. Second pressing issued in a 425gsm heavy cardboard cover with lyric sheet, limited to 500 copies in black and transparent yellow with red splatter. Third pressing issued in a 425gsm heavy cardboard cover with lyric sheet, limited to 500 copies in black, transparent piss yellow and transparent blood red
 Re-released in 2015 by Relapse Records in CD and digital format containing 8 bonus tracks
 Re-released in 2021 by Relapse Records as a limited edition cassette, issued in white and yellow

Personnel 
John Armstrong - Bass
Dave Carlo - Guitars & Drum Programming
Bob Reid - Vocals

Production
James Stanley - Recording
Alexander von Wieding - Artwork & Design (2009 Re-issue)
Larry Sullivan - Cover art
Brian Taylor - Recording
Dave Carlo - Producer
Dana Marostega - Layout

References

Razor (band) albums
1991 albums